Huron, of Bordeaux, was commissioned in 1793 as a privateer. She made several cruises before the British Royal Navy captured her in 1801 as she was returning to France with cargo from Mauritius. She was sold and then proceeded to sail between England and America as a merchantman. She was last listed in 1808.

Career
She was under Captain Pierre Destebetcho in 1793 (dates not clear), Captain Harismedy circa late 1797-1798, Destebetcho (first name not clear) from July 1798 to 1799, and Captain Saint Guiron from 1799 in Bordeaux to May 1800 in Mauritius.  

Ogilvy described her as a "remarkable fine Ship, ſails well, is pierced for Twenty Guns, had Eighteen mounted, but threw them all overboard except Four during the Chace; I think her a Vessel well calculated for His Majesty's Service." The Navy ignored his recommendation.

She was offered for sale on 15 May 1801, as was her cargo.

Huron, of 275 tons (bm), a French prize, appeared in the 1802 volume of Lloyd's Register (LR).

Fate
Huron was last listed in LR in 1808.

Notes, citations, and references
Notes

Citations

References
 

1793 ships
Ships built in France
Captured ships
Age of Sail merchant ships of England